Another Day Another Life is a 2009 American suspense thriller film produced, edited, and directed by Rohit Gupta. It's about a man, Jason, played by Benjamin Jacobs, who struggles to repress his killer instinct as he approaches the planned killing of his lover. The film was selected to showcase at the Short Film Corner - Cannes Film Festival 2009.
It received critical acclaim at its festival run winning awards & nominations.

Premise
After he loses everything, a man struggles with his desire for revenge.

Cast
 Benjamin Jacobs as Jason
 Amneek Sandhu as Rachel

Production
The film was shot in guerilla style in seven hours using Panasonic AG-DVX100 edited on Gupta's Mac Book Pro and put together for $100.  It was shot in Newport, Jersey City.

Critical reception
The film was selected to showcase at the Short Film Corner - Cannes 2009. It continued to be showcased for four years thereafter at the international festival circuit including at the International Astana Action Film Festival, Eastern Electronic Film Festival in the United Kingdom; Rainier Independent Film Festival, US; River Bend International Film Festival, US; India International Film Festival of Tampa Bay; Mix International Shorts Film Festival, US; Media Film Festival, US; Appalachian Film Festival, USA; The Dam Short Film Festival, US; Box[ur]Shorts Film Festival, Los Angeles; Big Mini DV Film Festival, NYC; Orlando Hispanic Film Festival, Florida; Brownfish Shorts Film Festival, New York City; Blue Snowman Film Festival, Canada; Rumschpringe International Short Film Festival 2011, US; Spirit Quest Film Festival, USA; United Nations Global Wake-Up Film Festival, Chicago; Silicon Valley Film Festival, US; Great Lakes International Film Festival, US; ITSA Film Festival, US; Anthem The Libertarian Film Festival, USA; Action On Film International Film Festival, US; IFC (Independent Film Channel) and Media Labs, US; EuroAsia Shorts International Film Festival and others.

A review from the Judges of the MIX International Shorts Film Festival said, "Another Day Another Life is a remarkably fast pace film, the action never slows or halts. The title is an excellent one that implies so many different things. There is no question this a compelling short film.". The film was chosen as the opening night film at the Golden Door International Film Festival. Bill Sorvino, Festival Director said: "We feel very fortunate to have such a strong beginning to our festival". On September 11, 2014 NDTV Prime, India's prime national television channel, broadcast the film nationwide.

Awards and nominations
The film has received various awards and nominations, with the nominations categories mainly ranging from recognition of the film itself (Best Short Film) to its direction, dramatic impact, music, and writing.

Official selections and screenings

See also
 The Usual Suspects
 Before the Devil Knows You're Dead
Changing Lanes

References

External links
 
 
 Rohit Gupta's Film makes it to Cannes
 Cannes Film Festival, Berlin and Facebook

2009 short films
Films set in New Jersey
Films shot in New Jersey
American short films
2009 films
Films directed by Rohit Gupta
2000s English-language films